The canton of Ris-Orangis is an administrative division of the Essonne department, Île-de-France region, northern France. Its borders were modified at the French canton reorganisation which came into effect in March 2015. Its seat is in Ris-Orangis.

It consists of the following communes:
Bondoufle 
Fleury-Mérogis
Le Plessis-Pâté
Ris-Orangis
Vert-le-Grand
Vert-le-Petit

References

Cantons of Essonne